Donie is an unincorporated community in southern Freestone County, Texas, United States.  It lies along State Highway 164 south of the city of Fairfield, the county seat of Freestone County.  Its elevation is 489 feet (149 m).  Although Donie is unincorporated, it has a post office, with the ZIP code of 75838.

References

Unincorporated communities in Freestone County, Texas
Unincorporated communities in Texas